Indervelly is a village in Adilabad district of the Indian state of Telangana. It is located in Indervelly mandal of Utnoor revenue division.

Geography

History
In 1981, the village was the site of a massacre where between 13 and 100+ Gondi people were killed when police opened fire on a crowd.

References

External links
Adilabad Mandals and their Gram Panchayats (map)

Villages in Adilabad district